The 2001 James Madison Dukes football team was an American football team that represented James Madison University during the 2001 NCAA Division I-AA football season as a member of the Atlantic 10 Conference. In their third year under head coach Mickey Matthews, the team compiled a 2–9 record.

Schedule

Notes

References

James Madison
James Madison Dukes football seasons
James Madison Dukes football